Charged multivesicular body protein 2a is a protein that in humans is encoded by the CHMP2A gene.

 It is a reference gene.

References

External links

Further reading